Yeshwanthpur, officially Yeshwanthpura is a locality in the north western part of Bangalore in the Indian state of Karnataka. It is located to the north of Malleshwara and west of Hebbala. The biggest wholesale market of agricultural produce in the city, the Yeshwanthpur APMC Yard, is situated in the locality. The green line of Namma metro passes through Yeshwanthpur metro station and allows the connectivity to all the extension of the city.

Etymology

Jayachamarajendra Wadiyar's association with Yeshwantrao Ghorpade led to common meetings, usually spent on hunting, and cup of tea in the outskirts of his Bangalore Palace. which was a small village and had the proximity of Mysore sandal soap factory. The conversation went late into nights, which made it difficult to head back to Palace. As a token of friendship. Yeshwantrao Ghorpade, Jayachamarajendra Wodeyar renamed the railway station in the area after the Yeshwantrao Ghorpade. Since, then the area has been popularly known as Yeshwanthpur. The largely popular Yesvantpur Junction railway station was commissioned by Mysore Maharaja Chamarajendra Wadiyar X in 1881.

Yeshwanthpur comprises many lesser known historic places, viz. 
 Deewanarapalya – In Kannada, Deewan means Prime minister (Mysore State), due to its proximity to Bangalore palace. This place was the serving quarters for the Deewan of Mysore. 
 Subedaarpalya – In Kannada, Subedar means Head of a Regiment, due to its proximity to Bangalore palace. This place was the serving quarters for the Subedaar of Mysore.

Both these places along with Vyalikaval (in Kannada means station of horses) and Malleshwara were important political and strategic points to the Kingdom of Mysore.

References

External links 

Neighbourhoods in Bangalore